Orechová is a village and municipality in the Sobrance District in the Košice Region of east Slovakia.

History
In historical records the village was first mentioned in 1299.

Geography
The village lies at an altitude of 135 metres and covers an area of 3.396 km².
It has a population of 250 people.

External links
 
https://web.archive.org/web/20080111223415/http://www.statistics.sk/mosmis/eng/run.html 
http://en.e-obce.sk/obec/orechova/orechova.html
https://web.archive.org/web/20140202114257/http://www.orechova.ocu.sk/

Villages and municipalities in Sobrance District